Krasnoyarsk State Agrarian University (Krasnoyarskiy Gosudarstvenniy Agrarniy Universitet) is a university in Krasnoyarsk, Russian Federation. Founded in 1953.

History 
The university was founded in 1953 as "Krasnoyarsk Agricultural Institute" (Красноярский сельскохозяйственный институт, КСХИ). In 1994, the institute got the status of a university. Since 2017, Krasnoyarsk State Agrarian University became the Accredited member of European Council for Business Education.

The university works under the license of the Ministry of Agriculture of Russian Federation. The university carries out basic research and works on its own research subjects in the fields of agriculture, environmental researching, economics and law.

Institutes (Faculties) 

As for 2019, Krasnoyarsk State Agrarian University consists of 7 Institutes (Faculties) 

 Institute of Agro-ecological Technologies (Институт агроэкологических технологий (ИАЭТ))
 Institute of Applied Biotechnology and Veterinary Medicine (Институт прикладной биотехнологии и ветеринарной медицины (ИПБиВМ))
 Institute of Food Production (Институт пищевых производств (ИПП))
 Institute of Engineering Systems and Power (Институт инженерных систем и энергетики (ИИСиЭ))
 Institute of Land Management, Cadastre and Environmental Engineering (Институт землеустройства, кадастров и природообустройства (ИЗКиП))
 Institute of Economics and Management of Agro-Industrial Complex (Институт экономики и управления АПК (ИЭиУ АПК))
 Institute of Law (Юридический институт (ЮИ))

See also 
 List of institutions of higher learning in Russia

References

External links
 Krasnoyarsk State Agrarian University official website

Universities in Krasnoyarsk Krai
Universities and institutes established in the Soviet Union
Educational institutions established in 1953
1953 establishments in the Soviet Union
Agricultural universities and colleges in Russia
Krasnoyarsk